Joseph A. Corpora III (born September 25, 1961) is a former Democratic member of the Pennsylvania House of Representatives.

References

Democratic Party members of the Pennsylvania House of Representatives
Living people
1961 births